Avanza (lit. Advance) was a political party in Guatemala.

History
Avanza is a political party that started on May 18, 2016 the political party was registered by the Supreme Electoral Tribunal, and its registration process ended on May 17, 2018. It currently has 29,000 members, its general secretary is Mario Antonio Guerra Leon, candidate for deputy for Heart New Nation in 2015. 
Avanza was made official in July 2018 as a political party and is qualified to participate in the 2019 general elections.

Presidential elections

References

External links

2018 establishments in Guatemala
2019 disestablishments in Guatemala
Defunct political parties in Guatemala
Political parties disestablished in 2019
Political parties established in 2018